Tartu JK Tammeka, commonly known as Tartu Tammeka or simply Tammeka, is a football club, based in Tartu, Estonia, that competes in the Meistriliiga, the top flight of Estonian football.

Founded in 1989, the club has played in the Meistriliiga since the 2005 season and have never been relegated from the Estonian top division. The club's home ground is Tartu Tamme Stadium.

History

Early years and road to the Meistriliiga 
Tammeka was founded on 13 June 1989 as a youth academy by Hillar Otto, Avo Jakovits and Heino Ligi. In 2000, the club joined the Estonian football league system and began competing in the Southern division of the III liiga. Tammeka's debut season was a success as the team finished first with 46 points out of the possible 60. Tammeka was promoted to the II liiga, and in 2001, to the Esiliiga. The club established itself in the Esiliiga by placing sixth in the 2002 season and seventh in the 2003 season. Tammeka won the Esiliiga in the 2004 season and was promoted to the Meistriliiga. The team defeated Dünamo 9–0 in their first Meistriliiga match and finished their first season in the Estonian top flight in seventh place. In December 2005, Sergei Ratnikov was appointed as manager. Tammeka finished the 2006 season in sixth place.

In 2007, Tammeka merged with Maag and became Maag Tammeka. Despite pooled resources, the team lost several key players and finished the 2007 season in fifth place. Ratnikov resigned in November 2007 and his assistant Sergei Zamogilnõi took over as manager. Maag Tammeka reached the 2007–08 Estonian Cup final, but lost to Flora 1–3. The team finished the 2008 season in seventh place, after which the sponsorship deal with Maag ended and Tammeka continued to operate as an independent club.

The following season, Tammeka had to operate with a smaller budget and lost several players. Reserve team coach Norbert Hurt was appointed as manager and several reserve team players were promoted to the first-team squad. Despite a slow start, Tammeka managed to finish the 2009 season in seventh place. In December 2009, Marko Kristal replaced Hurt as manager. Kristal rebuilt the team around youth system players Albert Prosa, Kaarel Kiidron and Siim Tenno, finishing the 2010 season in sixth place. Despite a good start in the 2011 season, the team's performance faded in the second half of the season. In September 2011, former Tammeka player Kristjan Tiirik replaced Kristal as manager and the team finished the season in seventh place. The subsequent winter transfer window saw the departure of several key players, including Prosa, Kiidron and Tenno. Following a poor start to the 2012 season, Tiirik was replaced by Joti Stamatopoulos in July 2012. Stamatopoulos failed to make a difference and Tammeka finished the season last, amassing only 20 points. Despite finishing last, Tammeka escaped relegation as Viljandi disbanded. In January 2013, Uwe Erkenbrecher was appointed as manager. Despite growing financial troubles, Tammeka finished the 2013 season in ninth place and defeated Tarvas 6–2 on aggregate in the relegation play-offs, securing their Meistriliiga spot.

Troubles with Meistriliiga license and new legal entity 
In February 2014, Tammeka lost their Meistriliiga license due to failing to pay players wages and refusing the reorganization plan proposed by the Estonian Football Association. The license to compete under the name Tammeka was granted to the team's academy. Former Tammeka player Indrek Koser was appointed as manager and the team came seventh in the 2014 season. Tammeka finished the 2015 season in ninth place, but avoided relegation by defeating Tallinna Kalev 4–2 on aggregate in the relegation play-offs. The team came seventh in the 2016 season. In November 2016, Tammeka announced that Mario Hansi and Kaido Koppel would replace Koser in the coming season. The team reached the 2016–17 Estonian Cup final, but were defeated by FCI Tallinn 0–2. Tammeka finished seventh again in the 2017 season. After the season, Hansi was appointed head of youth development and Koppel became the sole manager. Tammeka finished sixth in 2018 and fifth in 2019. After finishing fifth again in 2020, Tammeka experienced a difficult season in 2021, finishing in ninth place and having to play the relegation play-offs to secure their top-flight spot. For the 2022 season, Tartu Tammeka appointed Portuguese Miguel Santos as the manager of the team, but his tenure only lasted 21 games, as he left the role midway through the season. Tammeka finished the 2022 season in sixth place.

Stadium

Tamme Stadium 

The club's home ground is the 1,750-seat Tartu Tamme Stadium. First opened in 1932, it is the largest football stadium in Tartu. The stadium was renovated and re-opened in 2011. Tartu Tamme Stadium is located at Tamme 1, Tammelinn, Tartu.

Sepa Jalgpallikeskus 

Tammeka's training centre is Sepa Jalgpallikeskus, located in the Ropka industrial disctrict. Opened in 2016, the football centre has a natural grass training field and a 504-seat artificial turf ground with under-soil heating, of which the latter is used by the first team as a home ground during winter and early spring months. 

In April 2022, an indoor football facility named Annemõisa Jalgpallihall was opened in Tartu. Costing over 3 million euros, the complex facilitates footballers during the snowy winter and spring months.

Players

Current squad

For season transfers, see transfers summer 2022 and transfers winter 2022–23.

Out on loan

Reserves and academy

Club officials

Coaching staff

Managerial history

Honours

League
 Esiliiga
 Winners (1): 2004

Cup
 Estonian Cup
 Runners-up (2): 2007–08, 2016–17

Kit manufacturers and shirt sponsors

Seasons and statistics

Seasons

References

External links

  
 JK Tammeka at Estonian Football Association

 
1989 establishments in Estonia
Association football clubs established in 1989
Football clubs in Estonia
Meistriliiga clubs
Sport in Tartu